Elon Gold (born September 14, 1970) is an American comedian, television actor, writer and producer.

Early life
Elon Gold was born to Lynn and Sidney Gold of Goldstar Talent on September 14, 1970. He was raised in the Pelham Parkway section of The Bronx in New York. His older brother Steven is involved in the music production industry. He had a younger brother Ari, a rhythm and blues singer. He attended the Westchester Day School in Mamaroneck, New York and the Marsha Stern Talmudical Academy in Manhattan.

Career
Gold first starred in the television series Stacked. He also starred in the short-lived sitcom In-Laws. Best known for his impressions, including those of Jeff Goldblum, Howard Stern and Jay Leno, Gold was a judge on The Next Best Thing, a celebrity impersonation competition series on ABC. He appeared in the movie Cheaper by the Dozen (2003) as a cameraman from The Oprah Winfrey Show and had a recurring role in the short-lived ABC prime-time show, The Dana Carvey Show in 1996.

Gold often writes with his long-time friend and writing partner Ari Schiffer. The two have written multiple pilots together, including one that sold to Touchstone Television. Touchstone purchased the script, Wifeless, about two straight best friends who get married. He has appeared in several television shows, such as The Mentalist (2009) and Frasier (2004).

His 2014 comedy special, Chosen and Taken, appeared on Netflix. Gold appeared as himself in Season 3 of the Home Box Office series Crashing, first broadcast in 2019.

Filmography

Film

Television

Personal life
He is an observant Jew. On Friday, August 22, 2014, he was a victim of an antisemitic incident whilst walking home from one Shabbat dinner in Los Angeles, California. He wrote an op ed about it in The Jewish Journal of Greater Los Angeles a few days later.

References

External links

1970 births
Living people
20th-century American comedians
21st-century American comedians
21st-century American Jews
American impressionists (entertainers)
American male comedians
American male television actors
American sketch comedians
American stand-up comedians
Jewish American male comedians
Television producers from New York City
American television writers
American male television writers
Jewish American male actors
People from the Bronx
Male actors from New York City
American Orthodox Jews
Comedians from New York City
Screenwriters from New York (state)